Ascq station (French: Gare d'Ascq) is a railway station serving the former village of Ascq, now part of Villeneuve-d'Ascq city, Nord department, northern France.

History 
In nineteenth century the industrial revolution is developing industry in northern France. Ascq is linked to Lille with the construction of the railway station in 1865, and in 1885 to Roubaix.

During the Second World War, numerous trains were going through Ascq and members of the resistance would regularly commit acts of sabotage. On 1 April 1944, after such an act of sabotage, the Nazis killed 86 men. This event is known as the Ascq massacre.

In the late 1990s, before the construction of a new Belgian high speed railway line, Eurostar and Thalys trains going to Belgium were going through Ascq station.

Services

The station is served by regional trains to Lille and Tournai (Belgium), and buses to Orchies. Ilévia bus lines 13 and 73 serve the station.

Trains garage 

The railway station hosts a little train museum in the trains garage (halle aux trains) animated by the AAATV association. It houses a steam locomotive 141 TC 51 and an electric locomotive BB 12004 restored among many other train materials.

Gallery

See also 

 List of SNCF stations in Hauts-de-France

References

Buildings and structures in Villeneuve-d'Ascq
Railway stations in France opened in 1865
Railway stations in Nord (French department)